Chrislyn John van Schalkwyk (born 12 October 1990) is a South African rugby union player, currently playing with Boland club side Wesbank. His regular position is winger.

Career

Youth

Senior career

He wasn't used again that season, but did play in the 2012 Currie Cup First Division, scoring four tries in his nine appearances.

References

South African rugby union players
Living people
1990 births
Border Bulldogs players
Rugby union players from the Western Cape
Rugby union wings